The Lagos Prison Break occurred on October 10, 2014 when five persons (Ayodeji Bello, 32, Saibu Abdul Razak, 21, Adebayo Dada, 24, Desmond Issac 35 and Peter Kingsley, 29) escaped from the Kirikiri Medium Prison.

Incident
The incident was reported to have occurred on 10 October 2014 at around 4 pm. The prison break was unsuccessful as a result of a collaborative effort of the Kirikiri divisional police officers and the officers of the Nigerian Prisons Services on duty, who prevented the prison break.
The incident was linked with a minor riot that occurred within the prison, a riot whose causes was unclear.

See also

Kogi prison break
Ondo prison break
Ogun prison break

References

Attacks in Nigeria in 2014
Crime in Lagos
Prison escapes
2014 crimes in Nigeria
Escapees from Nigerian detention
October 2014 crimes
October 2014 events in Africa